Suyt'uqucha (Quechua suyt'u, sayt'u rectangular, qucha lake, "rectangular lake", hispanicized spelling Suytojocha) is a lake in the Ayacucho Region in Peru. It is located in the Lucanas Province, Chipao District. Suyt'uqucha lies northwest and west of Wat'aqucha and  Chawpiqucha.

References

Lakes of Peru
Lakes of Ayacucho Region